Cyclooctanone is an organic compound with the formula .  It is a waxy white solid that can be prepared by Jones oxidation of cyclooctanol.  It can also be produced by ketonization reaction starting with azelaic acid.

References

Cycloalkanones
Eight-membered rings